Acriopsis lilifolia is a species of orchid in the genus Acriopsis.

References 

Cymbidiinae